Louis James DeWolfe Jr. (born September 6, 1940) is an American lawyer and politician who served one term as a member of the New Hampshire House of Representatives from 1971 to 1973. A native of Reading, Massachusetts, he graduated from Reading Memorial High School in 1958 and Tufts University in 1966.

References

Living people
1940 births
Republican Party members of the New Hampshire House of Representatives
People from Dover, New Hampshire
People from Reading, Massachusetts
Tufts University alumni
20th-century American politicians